Lan Chang Province was a former province of the Kingdom of Thailand. It encompassed the eastern slopes of the Luang Prabang Range in Laos, with Xaignabouli (Sainyabuli) as the administrative headquarters. It included parts of former the Luang Prabang and Xaignabouli provinces of French Laos.

Annexed in 1941, Thailand returned it to French Indochina in 1946, along with all other areas it had gained by the war as a condition for admission to the United Nations. Accordingly, all wartime claims against Thailand were dropped and the kingdom received a substantial American aid package in gratitude for the assistance its anti-Japanese underground had provided to the Allied war effort.

History
Lan Chang Province was named after the ancient Lan Xang kingdom, to which the area had once belonged. Its name means a 'Million Elephants'.

In 1904, Siam ceded the Laotian inhabited area of the Luang Prabang Range to colonial French Indochina.

In August 1940, after a series of border clashes, the Axis-leaning government of Thailand attacked French military posts on the eastern banks of the Mekong between Vientiane and Champassak Province. Both Thailand and the French colonial government would declare war. The more modern Thai Army won many victories on land, but the Royal Thai Navy was caught by a larger French fleet and suffered a humiliating defeat. The Japanese government intervened to mediate a ceasefire. In the ensuing talks in 1941, the French colonial government was forced to cede western Champassak Province and all of Xaignabouli of Laos and Battambang Province of Cambodia to the Thais. Zaignabouli was renamed the Province of Lan Chang. The Thai administration was not very active in the province during that time and the largely rural districts were pretty much left to themselves until they were reincorporated into Laos.

At the end of World War II France threatened to block Thai entry into the United Nations unless it returned the provinces to their colonial empire. The Thai government, now under the control of members of the underground who had opposed the Japanese, was anxious to show its repudiation of the previous military government. It willingly signed the Washington Accord, surrendering all war time territorial gains. Lan Chang Province was returned to Laos in 1946 and resumed its pre-war name.

Administrative divisions
During its short history, Lan Chang Province was divided into six districts (amphoe). They were established on 23 July 1941.

See also
History of Laos
Seals of the provinces of Thailand

Bibliography
Søren Ivarsson, Creating Laos: The Making of a Lao Space Between Indochina and Siam, 1860-1945. NIAS monographs.  (May 2008)

References

External links
Timeline of the History of Laos 

Sainyabuli province
Former provinces of Thailand
History of Laos
1941 in Thailand